Denver Township may refer to the following places in the United States:

 Denver Township, Richland County, Illinois
 Denver Township, Isabella County, Michigan
 Denver Township, Newaygo County, Michigan
 Denver Township, Rock County, Minnesota
 Denver Township, Adams County, Nebraska

See also 
 Denver (disambiguation)

Township name disambiguation pages